The Federal Financing Bank (FFB) is a United States government corporation created by Congress in 1973 under the general supervision of the Secretary of the Treasury. The FFB was established to centralize and reduce the cost of federal borrowing, as well as federally assisted borrowing from the public. The FFB was also established to deal with federal budget management issues which occurred when off-budget financing flooded the government securities market with offers of a variety of government-backed securities that were competing with Treasury securities. Today the FFB has statutory authority to purchase any obligation issued, sold, or guaranteed by a federal agency to ensure that fully guaranteed obligations are financed efficiently.  the FFB had $74.2 billion in assets and $69.6 billion in liabilities, for a net position of $4.6 billion.

See also
 Title 12 of the Code of Federal Regulations
 United States Department of the Treasury

Notes

References

External links
 Official website

United States Department of the Treasury agencies
Government-owned companies of the United States